The Daughter is a novel by Pavlos Matesis, published in Greece in 1990, translated to English in 2002. It takes in the events of the Second World War from the perspective of a young Greek girl. It is an international bestseller in nine languages and has sold over 150,000 copies in Greece alone.

References

Historical novels
2002 novels
Novels set in Greece during World War II